Žarko Olarević (born 28 July 1950) is a Serbian former football manager and player.

Playing career
Olarević made his competitive debut for Partizan in the second half of the 1967–68 season. He later spent two seasons at Proleter Zrenjanin, before returning to Partizan. In the 1972 winter transfer window, Olarević was transferred to Radnički Kragujevac.

In 1976, Olarević went abroad to Belgium to play for Royal Antwerp. He subsequently moved to France and joined Lille, helping the club to promotion to the top flight in 1978. Between 1981 and 1983, Olarević spent two seasons at Le Havre. He retired after playing for Marseille in 1983–84.

Managerial career
Shortly after hanging up his boots, Olarević became manager of Marseille, leading them to the 1986 Coupe de France Final. He later served as manager of Bulgaria's Slavia Sofia, Morocco's Wydad Casablanca, and Poland's Zagłębie Lubin.

Honours
Proleter Zrenjanin
 Yugoslav Second League: 1970–71
Radnički Kragujevac
 Yugoslav Second League: 1973–74
Lille
 French Division 2: 1977–78
Marseille
 French Division 2: 1983–84

References

External links
 
 

1950 births
Living people
Footballers from Belgrade
Yugoslav footballers
Serbian footballers
Association football forwards
FK Partizan players
FK Proleter Zrenjanin players
FK Radnički 1923 players
Royal Antwerp F.C. players
Lille OSC players
Le Havre AC players
Olympique de Marseille players
Yugoslav First League players
Yugoslav Second League players
Belgian Pro League players
Ligue 2 players
Ligue 1 players
Yugoslav expatriate footballers
Expatriate footballers in Belgium
Expatriate footballers in France
Yugoslav expatriate sportspeople in Belgium
Yugoslav expatriate sportspeople in France
Yugoslav football managers
Serbia and Montenegro football managers
Serbian football managers
Olympique de Marseille managers
FK Radnički 1923 managers
FK Sutjeska Nikšić managers
PFC Slavia Sofia managers
Wydad AC managers
Zagłębie Lubin managers
Ligue 1 managers
Botola managers
Yugoslav expatriate football managers
Serbia and Montenegro expatriate football managers
Expatriate football managers in France
Expatriate football managers in Bulgaria
Expatriate football managers in Morocco
Expatriate football managers in Poland
Serbia and Montenegro expatriate sportspeople in Bulgaria
Serbia and Montenegro expatriate sportspeople in Poland